Diadelia x-fusca is a species of beetle in the family Cerambycidae. It was described by Breuning in 1965. It is known from Madagascar.

References

Diadelia
Beetles described in 1965